The Roes Creek Campground Camptender's Cabin, also known as the Rising Sun Campground Ranger Cabin, in Glacier National Park is an example of the National Park Service Rustic style.

Built in 1937 and designed by the National Park Service (NPS) Branch of Plans and Design, this small cabin is significant for its association with an important trend in park visitation patterns: the increase of middle-class automobile tourists and federal (versus concessionaire) development of infrastructure appropriate to this new clientele. In addition to basic services, an increased NPS presence was also warranted: campgrounds were assigned seasonal "camptenders" who performed custodial duties and provided assistance to visitors.

See also
Rising Sun Auto Camp

References

Park buildings and structures on the National Register of Historic Places in Montana
Log cabins in the United States
National Park Service rustic in Montana
National Register of Historic Places in Glacier County, Montana
Log buildings and structures on the National Register of Historic Places in Montana
1937 establishments in Montana
National Register of Historic Places in Glacier National Park
Camping in the United States